Gunsight Mountain is located in the Lewis Range, Glacier National Park in the U.S. state of Montana. Gunsight Mountain is named after the adjacent Gunsight Pass, which was named by George Bird Grinnell in 1891.

Geology

Like other mountains in Glacier National Park, Gunsight Mountain is composed of sedimentary rock laid down during the Precambrian to Jurassic periods.

See also
 Mountains and mountain ranges of Glacier National Park (U.S.)

References

External links
 Gunsight Mountain: Weather forecast

Mountains of Flathead County, Montana
Mountains of Glacier National Park (U.S.)
Lewis Range